Awano may refer to:
 Awano people, an ethnic group of Peru
 Awano language, a language of Peru
 Awano, Tochigi, a former town in Tochigi Prefecture, Japan
 Awano Station, a railway station in Fukui Prefecture, Japan (not to be confused with Nagato-Awano Station in Yamaguchi Prefecture)
 Awano, a Japanese surname; notable people include:
 Hideyuki Awano (born 1964), baseball player
 Rainosuke Awano, gardener
 Yasuhiro Awano (born 1988), martial artist

Japanese-language surnames